Rolnik is a Polish-language surname literally meaning "farmer". The Lithuanized form is Rolnikas.

Notable people with the surname include:
Guy Rolnik (born 1968), Israeli journalist, executive, entrepreneur
Daniel Rolnik (born 1989), American art critic and gallerist
Raquel Rolnik (born 1956), Brazilian architect and urban planner

See also
 

Polish-language surnames